Nyhart is an unincorporated community in Bates County, in the U.S. state of Missouri.

History
A post office was established at Nyhart in 1886, and remained in operation until 1908. The community has the name of Noah Nyhart, an early settler.

References

Unincorporated communities in Bates County, Missouri
Unincorporated communities in Missouri